Zonsé is a town and seat of the Zonsé Department of Boulgou Province in south-eastern Burkina Faso. As of 2005, the town has a population of 787.

References

Populated places in the Centre-Est Region
Boulgou Province